The Men's Qatar Classic 2013 is the men's edition of the 2013 Qatar Classic squash tournament, which is a PSA World Series platinum event ($150,000 prize money). The event took place in Doha from 10 November to 15 November. Mohamed El Shorbagy won his first Qatar Classic trophy, beating Nick Matthew in the final.

Prize money and ranking points
For 2013, the prize purse was $150,000. The prize money and points breakdown is as follows:

Seeds

Draw and results

See also
Qatar Classic
2013 Men's World Open Squash Championship
PSA World Tour 2013
PSA World Series 2013

References

External links
PSA Qatar Classic 2013 website
Qatar Classic 2013 Squashsite website
Qatar Squash Federation website

Men's Qatar Classic (squash)
Men's Qatar Classic (squash)
Squash tournaments in Qatar